Llywelyn Cremona (born 7 May 1995) is a Maltese professional footballer who plays for Maltese Premier League side Gudja United, on loan from Birkirkara, where he plays as an attacking midfielder or second striker.

Club career
Cremona was part of the Valletta F.C. youth nursery from 1999 to 2011, playing important part in the capital city youth sides. He made his debut in 2011 for the senior Valletta side, however he was part of the senior squad as from 2007.

During his time as part of the senior Valletta squad, he won 5 honours, 2 of which were a Double, in 2013–14. These were 4 Maltese Premier League trophies in (2007-08, 2011-12, 2013-14, 2015-16) and 1 Maltese FA Trophy: 2013-14.

On 4 July 2017, Birkirkara made a signed Cremona from rivals Valletta.  Valletta F.C. also confirmed the news on their website. Cremona signed for The Stripes for 3 seasons. Cremona was banned for match-fixing in January 2018 for one year.

When Cremona went back from the suspension in January 2019, he was loaned out to Gudja United for the rest of the season.

International career
Cremona featured in the Malta national under-17 football team and the Malta national under-19 football team. He also featured in the Malta national under-21 football team under Silvio Vella, making his debut on 5 September 2014.

Cremona was called up to the Malta senior national team for the first time on 29 September 2014. He made his official debut on 12 November 2015 under Pietro Ghedin.

Honours

Club
Maltese Premier League: 2007-08, 2011-12, 2013-14, 2015-16
Maltese FA Trophy: 2013-14

References

1995 births
Living people
Maltese footballers
Association football midfielders
Birkirkara F.C. players
Valletta F.C. players
Maltese Premier League players
Gudja United F.C. players
Malta youth international footballers
Malta under-21 international footballers
Malta international footballers